Deucha Panchami (ডেউচা-পাঁচামি) coal mine or Deaucha Panchami coal block is a coal mine situated in Deucha and Panchamati area under Mohamadbazar community Development Block of Birbhum district, West Bengal, India. This coal mine or block belongs to Birbhum coalfield area. There are about 2102 million tonnes of coal reserves in Deucha Panchami coal block. This coal mine is the second-largest coal mine or coal block in the World and the largest in India, due to the amount of coal reserves. It is the newest coal mine in West Bengal.

Controversy 
There happens a political agitation between the local Adivasis and ruling All India Trinamool Congress cadres in December 2021. Tribals of the area are against the construction of mine and refused to accept the compensation. As per the news report they fear for eviction and loss of their properties, forest, agricultural land hence they claim that they do not want coal mines in the area. Government officials meet with tribals protesters to resolve the issue. It is also claimed by the administration that CPI (Maoist) sided with the anti coal mine movement.

Transport

Railway
The nearest important city railway station from this coal mine is Sainthia Junction.

Road
The Panagarh–Morgram Highway runs above part of this coal block.

See also
 Birbhum coalfield

References 

Coalfields of India
Mining in West Bengal